Harald Tandrup (31 January 1874 in Copenhagen – 10 May 1964) was a Danish writer. He used the pseudonyms Claus Colding or Klavs Kolding. His first novel was entitled Ain-Mokra and appeared 1900. He also wrote Reluctant Prophet (first U.S. edition in 1939). In 1946 he was excluded from the Danish Writer's Association (Danske Dramatikeres Forbund).

1874 births
1964 deaths
Danish male writers
Writers from Copenhagen